Break Your Back may refer to:

 "Break Your Back", a song by Jay Sean
 "Break Your Back", a song by Ultravox from Quartet
 "Break Your Back", a piece by Willie Henderson

See also
 "Break Ya Back (In a Good Way)", a song by Avant from Avant
 "Break Yo Back", a song by Kurupt from Originals